Tummy time is a colloquialism for placing infants in the prone position while awake and supervised, to encourage development of the neck and trunk muscles and prevent skull deformations.

In 1992, the American Academy of Pediatrics recommended babies sleep on their backs to prevent Sudden Infant Death Syndrome (SIDS). Although the rate of SIDS decreased by 50% since the Safe to Sleep campaign started in 1994, an unintended consequence was that babies missed out on the twelve or so hours they used to spend in the prone position while asleep, and there was a sharp increase in plagiocephaly (flat head syndrome) in infants. Along with tummy time, rotating the direction infants lie in their cribs as well as avoiding too much time in car seats, carriers, and bouncers are behaviors recommended to alleviate the associated risks of infants sleeping in a supine position.

Impact on development

Infants put to sleep in the supine position have been found to reach motor developmental milestones (e.g. crawling, rolling, and sitting) at a slower rate compared to infants who sleep in the prone position. When babies experience tummy time in their waking hours, they are provided with opportunities to strengthen their neck and trunk muscles. Positioning the infant on their stomach while awake will not impact the amount of slow wave sleep since tummy time only occurs when an infant is awake.

Furthermore, tummy time provides infants with opportunities for cognitive and communicative development through interactive play with their supervisor.

Implementation 
Tummy time is recommended to be practiced from birth, first in short sessions of three to five minutes, two to three times a day. As babies grow more receptive towards the sessions, they can be extended and performed more frequently. The World Health Organisation advises that infants under one year of age who are not yet mobile should experience tummy time for at least 30 minutes per day across sessions. Supervision by a parent or caregiver is important during tummy time so that the infant's position can be monitored and to encourage social interaction. Babies who are unaccustomed to frequent tummy time sessions may cry or show noncompliance when it is first introduced, however enjoyment may be increased by providing stimulating objects during sessions, such as preferred toys and videos.

Tummy time may also be used to stabilize the neck in torticollis, and to address hypertonia associated with Down syndrome.

Although sleeping in the supine position without sufficient tummy time may change the physical appearance of the head through plagiocephaly and consequently promote developmental delays, regardless of these effects, it is essential that infants are placed to sleep on their back due to the risk of SIDS.

See also
 Sudden infant death syndrome
 Safe to Sleep Campaign
 Plagiocephaly
 Torticollis

References

Further reading

Pediatrics